Zoran Stefanović (born 21 November 1969 in Loznica) is a Serbian author, publisher and cultural activist, best known as the founder of several cultural networks, including Project Rastko. His works were published and produced in Europe and US.

He made his debut in theater and film in 1987 and he graduated in dramaturgy and screenwriting in 1994 at the Faculty of Dramatic Arts (University of Arts in Belgrade). He lives in Belgrade.

He is the president of the Association of Playwrights of Serbia (2022).

Writings 

Some of his works belong to science fiction and fantasy - in the theater ("Slavic Orpheus," "Fable of the Cosmic Egg"), graphic novels and comics ("The Third Argument", based on stories by Milorad Pavić, "Under the Seal of the Wolf"), prose (novel Verigaši) and in film/television ("Narrow Paths").

His other works are documentary, such as the TV-series "The Janus' Face of History," or films "Lives of Kosta Hakman" and "Music of Silence" .

His theater plays, prose and graphic novels have been translated into Macedonian, Romanian, Slovene, English, French, Polish, Ukrainian and Russian.

Cultural work 

Stefanović was the principal founder of several international cultural networks: Project Rastko (network of digital libraries), Distributed Proofreaders Europe (international digitization of cultural heritage), the Project Gutenberg Europe (Beta version, a public digital library) and similar communities in the fields of digitization, lexicography and pop-culture.

He is also active in cultural and scientific projects since 1993, especially in the former Yugoslavia, Romania, Bulgaria, Greece, Ukraine, Russia and Poland, including preservation of minority cultures as well as initiative for Balkan Cultural Network, with Greek cultural activist and music producer Nikos Valkanos.

Since the mid-1990s he promotes the philosophy of open sources and free knowledge, as "the very foundation of every civilized human society." He actively supports several regional Wikipedias, particularly in Eastern and Central Europe since 2004.

Awards and honors 

As a writer, playwright and screenwriter, he has been nationally and internationally awarded and short-listed some twenty times, including The "Josip Kulundžić" award for theatrical play, Gold medal for the screenplay at the 42nd Festival of Yugoslav documentary and short films, two wins in Yugoslav literary SF/F competitions "Znak Sagite", Grand Prix for the best Serbian graphic novel and Award for the best graphic novel script, The Edition of the Year of The Belgrade Book Fair. He was nominated for the Prix Europa award in Berlin and the Prix Italia award in Rome.

For his cultural and publishing work he has been also nationally and internationally recognized, including three times the Annual award of the Informatics Society of Serbia, ten YU Web Top 50 awards (SR Web Top 50) and Webfest 2007 Award for the best culture site of the Western Balkans. He has been nominated for United Nations World Summit Award and Central European Review Content Crown award.

Selected bibliography 

Theatrical and radio plays
 An Island Story (Ostrvska priča), 1987, based on characters from Corto Maltese comics series by Hugo Pratt, directed by Zoran Đorđević
 Tristia, 1990.
 Weekend with Marija Broz (Vikend sa Marijom Broz), 1990.
 Slavic Orpheus (Slovenski Orfej), 1992.
 Fable of the Cosmic Egg (Skaska o kosmičkom jajetu), 1992.
 The Meeting Point (Tačka susreta), 1992.
 Snow is not White (Sneg nije beo), 2009.
 A waltz for Olga (Valcer za Olgu), 2018.

Books of plays
 Slavic Orpheus and other plays (Slovenski Orfej i druge drame), Znak Sagite, Belgrade, 1995.

Novels
 Chainers of the World, a novel of our people (Verigaši, roman o Našima), Everest media, Belgrade, 1993, 2012.

Comics and graphic novels
 The Third Argument (Treći argument) with writer Milorad Pavić and artist Zoran Tucić
 albums, Serbian and English, Bata-Orbis, Belgrade-Limasol, 1995; 
 serialized in English, Heavy Metal Magazine, New York, 1998/1999/2000.
 Under the Seal of the Wolf (Pod vučjim žigom) with artist Antoan Simić
 Stripmania, magazine, Belgrade, 1996.
 Duke Lipen (Knez Lipen) with artist Siniša Banović
 Parabellum, magazine, Sarajevo, 2012.

History and aesthetics of comics (monographs)

 The Comics We Loved, Selection of 20th Century Comics and Creators from the Region of Former Yugoslavia (Stripovi koje smo voleli: izbor stripova i stvaralaca sa prostora bivše Jugoslavije u XX veku), a critical lexicon, co-author with Živojin Tamburić, Zdravko Zupan and Paul Gravett, "Omnibus", Belgrade, 2011. (Serbian and English)
 Little Nemo in Slumberland (Mali Nemo u Zemlji snova) Vol. 1-5, introductory essays for Winsor McCay's complete series in Serbian translation, "Makondo", Belgrade, 2013-2015. Vol 1. , Vol 2. 
 Dikan. Vol. 1, (1969-1971), by Lazo Sredanović, Nikola Lekić et al., editing and essays, "Everest Media", Belgrade 2013. 
 "The Soundless Hiss: A critical history of Kobra comics series" ("Siktaj bez zvuka: kritička istorija serijala Kobra"), in: Kobra, Vol. 1, by Svetozar Obradović and Branislav Kerac, "Darkwood", Belgrade, 2013, pp. 157–189.  
 Lectures on comics (Predavanja o stripu), DVD, co-author, edited by Mićun Ristić, Dom kulture Studentski grad, 2014.

Selected filmography 

Writer
 Give my regards to all who ask for me (Pozdravi sve koji pitaju za mene), documentary, 1987 (script collaborator)
 Ars longa, vita brevis, 1991
 Slavic Orpheus (Slovenski Orfej), theatrical adaptation, 1992
 Janus' Face of History (Janusovo lice istorije) 1–3, documentary mini-series, 1993
 Narrow Paths (Uske staze), short, 1995
 Lives of Kosta Hakman (Životi Koste Hakmana), documentary, 2005
 Music of Silence (Muzika tišine), documentary, 2011
 120 years of Serbian Literary Cooperation (120 godina Srpske književne zadruge), documentary 2012 
 Lectures on comics (Predavanja o stripu), documentary, 2014 (contributing writer)
 Sava Lozanić bells (Zvona Save Lozanića), documentary, 2018

Producer
 My dead town (Moj mrtvi grad), documentary, 2000
 Lives of Kosta Hakman (Životi Koste Hakmana), documentary, 2005

Casting Departement
 Largo Winch, 2008 (casting: Serbia)

References

External links

 
 Slavic Orpheus, a drama, official site
 Music of Silence project, official site
 "Comics Culture in Yugoslavia: World-Class Innovators & Remarkable Visionaries" by Paul Gravett, foreword for Tamburić-Zupan-Stefanović lexicon The Comics We Loved: Selection of 20th Century Comics and Creators from the Region of Former Yugoslavia, 2011.

1969 births
Living people
People from Loznica
Serbian screenwriters
Male screenwriters
Serbian dramatists and playwrights
Serbian male short story writers
Serbian short story writers
Serbian science fiction writers
Serbian comics writers
Serbian non-fiction writers
Serbian literary critics
Comics critics
Comic book publishers (people)
University of Belgrade Faculty of Dramatic Arts alumni
Signalism
Serbian publishers (people)
Serbian journalists
Serbian fantasy writers
Serbian magazine editors
Serbian book editors
News editors
Academic journal editors
Comic book editors
Serbian speculative fiction editors
Science fiction editors
Male speculative fiction editors
Serbian literary editors
Serbian editors
Male non-fiction writers